The  was a Japanese noblewoman and waka poet in the Heian period.

Her work appears in a large number of imperial poetry collections, including Shingoshūi Wakashū, Senzai Wakashū, Shokugosen Wakashū, Gyokuyō Wakashū, Shinsenzai Wakashū, Shinchokusen Wakashū, and others.

Poetry 
One of her poems is included in the Ogura Hyakunin Isshu:

External links 
E-text of her poems in Japanese

1130 births
1200 deaths
Fujiwara clan
12th-century Japanese poets
Japanese women poets
Hyakunin Isshu poets
12th-century Japanese women writers